Annese is a surname. Notable people with the surname include:

Gennaro Annese (1604–1648), Italian Revolutionary
Maurie Annese (born 1971), Australian actor and producer
Vincenzo Alberto Annese (born 1984), Italian footballer and manager

English-language surnames